Treasure Truck was a free subscription-based service offered to Amazon customers in the US and UK. It notified subscribers of hand selected offers and experiences via SMS.

History 
The first Treasure Truck was released in Amazon's hometown of Seattle in June 2015. Initially, Treasure Truck offered one item at a time, which customers ordered using the Amazon app and picked up at a designated location the same day. As part of a holiday promotion, Seattle Seahawks player Marshawn Lynch drove the Treasure Truck around Seattle in December 2016 selling a limited-edition beast-mode Echo. In December 2017, two cities in the United Kingdom became the first international locations for the Treasure Truck program.  Each Treasure Truck was active up to 5 days per week.

Offers 
Treasure Truck's one-day offers included popular, trending, or interesting products from a wide variety of product categories. Previous offers included housewares, tech gadgets, smart home devices, outdoor gear, beauty items, games, and toys.

Shift to delivery 
After pausing offers during the COVID-19 pandemic, Treasure Truck resumed offers in both the US and UK in August and September 2020, respectively, with a new fulfilment model. Customers still order through the Amazon app or website, but items were shipped to their homes directly, instead of requiring pickup.

Expansion 
In April 2021, Treasure Truck expanded its availability to serve more customers across the US and UK.

End of the Treasure Truck 
The service ended in the UK on January 12, 2022. The service ended in the US on November 2, 2022, after Amazon published a notification on the Treasure Truck website stating "As of November 2, 2022 we will no longer offer Treasure Truck promotions.".

References 

Amazon (company)